Robert Blattner may refer to:
Buddy Blattner (1920–2009), American table tennis and baseball player
Robert James Blattner (1931–2015), American mathematician